KxK (also spelt KXK and Kxk) Guitars, established in 1997, is a guitar company whose specialty lies mainly in custom guitars for heavy metal artists. All their instruments are made in the United States and are handcrafted. The company will start doing a new KK Downing signature series.

Notable musicians

 KK Downing (Judas Priest)
 Karl Sanders (Nile)
 Manni Schmidt (Grave Digger)
 Steve Swanson (Six Feet Under)

Prominent guitars
 KK Downing Custom V (As used by KK Downing, Judas Priest)
 WarfaceV (As used by Laura Christine, Warface)
 SSV Series (As used by Steve Swanson, Six Feet Under)
 WarriorV (As used by Karl Sanders, Nile)
 V1 Series
 7 String V
 New 7 string
 BSG (As used by Tommy Gibbons, Koama)

Custom guitars

 Karl Sanders double neck WarriorV
 V1 with recessed "The Mandrake" logo 
 Custom SSV (different variants)
 OM-1 with Bat/Moon inlays
 V1 black with neon green bevels
 Graveside's custom left hand guitar
 7 string prototype. Tone pros bridge, Dimarzio X2N-7
 6 string prototype with Kahler bridge EMG 81/85
 7 string 27 fret Warrior V reverse head.
 8 string Prototype

External links
 KxK Guitars official Website
 KxK MySpace

Guitar manufacturing companies of the United States